The Flower Cup (Japanese フラワーカップ) is a Grade 3 horse race for three-year-old Thoroughbred fillies run in March over a distance of 1800 metres at Nakayama Racecourse.

The race was first run in 1987 and has been run at Grade 3 level ever since.

Winners since 2000 

 The 2011 running took place at Hanshin Racecourse.

Earlier winners

 1987 - Hase Vertex
 1988 - Free Talk
 1989 - Real Sapphire
 1990 - Yukino Surprise
 1991 - Flash Shower
 1992 - Brand Art
 1993 - Hokuto Vega
 1994 - Onward Noble
 1995 - Ibuki New Star
 1996 - Hishi Batalie
 1997 - Seeking the Pearl
 1998 - Sugino Cutie
 1999 - Sayaki

See also
 Horse racing in Japan
 List of Japanese flat horse races

References

Turf races in Japan